Protea piscina, also given the vernacular name Visgat sugarbush, is a shrub of the family Proteaceae that is native to South Africa.

References

External links

piscina
Flora of the Cape Provinces
Endemic flora of South Africa
Taxa named by John Patrick Rourke
Plants described in 1978